The 1981 NBA draft was the 35th annual draft of the National Basketball Association (NBA). The draft was held on June 9, 1981, before the 1981–82 season. The draft was broadcast in the United States on the USA Network. In this draft, 23 NBA teams took turns selecting amateur U.S. college basketball players and other eligible players, including international players. The first two picks in the draft belonged to the teams that finished last in each conference, with the order determined by a coin flip. The Dallas Mavericks won the coin flip and were awarded the first overall pick, while the Detroit Pistons were awarded the second pick. The remaining first-round picks and the subsequent rounds were assigned to teams in reverse order of their win–loss record in the previous season. A player who had finished his four-year college eligibility was automatically eligible for selection. Before the draft, five college underclassmen announced that they would leave college early and would be eligible for selection. The draft consisted of 10 rounds comprising the selection of 223 players.

The Dallas Mavericks used their first pick to draft 1980 Naismith College Player of the Year Mark Aguirre from DePaul University. Aguirre, who had just finished his junior season in college, became the second underclassman to be drafted first overall, after Magic Johnson in 1979. The Detroit Pistons used the second overall pick to draft Isiah Thomas, a sophomore guard from Indiana University. Thomas had just won the 1981 National Collegiate Athletic Association (NCAA) Championship with Indiana and was named as the tournament's Most Outstanding Player. The New Jersey Nets used the third pick to draft another underclassman, Buck Williams, from the University of Maryland. Williams went on to win the Rookie of the Year Award and was also selected to the All-Star Game in his rookie season. This draft marked the first time that the first three selections were college underclassmen. Danny Ainge, the 1981 Wooden College Player of the Year, was selected in the second round with the 31st pick by the Boston Celtics. Ainge had been playing professional baseball since 1979 with the Toronto Blue Jays in the Major League Baseball (MLB) while also playing college basketball at Brigham Young University. He reportedly preferred to continue his baseball career, but the Celtics successfully persuaded him to play basketball instead. He is one of only twelve athletes who have played in both the NBA and MLB.

Key

Draft

Notable post-second round picks

The following list includes other draft picks who have appeared in at least one NBA game.

Notable undrafted players
These players were not selected in the 1981 draft but played at least one game in the NBA.

Trades

Draft-day trades
The following trades involving drafted players were made on the day of the draft.
 The Indiana Pacers acquired the draft rights to 32nd pick Mike Olliver from the Chicago Bulls in exchange for the draft rights to 36th pick Ray Blume and a 1982 second-round pick.

Pre-draft trades
Prior to the day of the draft, the following trades were made and resulted in exchanges of picks between the teams.
 On June 8, 1981, the Atlanta Hawks acquired a 1981 first-round pick and a 1981 second-round pick from the Chicago Bulls in exchange for a 1981 first-round pick, a 1982 second-round pick and an option to swap 1982 first-round draft picks. Previously, the Bulls acquired the draft rights to Ronnie Lester and the first-round pick on June 10, 1980, from the Portland Trail Blazers in exchange for the draft rights to Kelvin Ransey and a 1981 first-round pick. Previously, the Blazers acquired the pick on February 8, 1980, from the Philadelphia 76ers in exchange for Lionel Hollins. Previously, the 76ers acquired the pick and a 1983 first-round pick on October 3, 1977, from the Cleveland Cavaliers in exchange for Terry Furlow. The Hawks used the picks to draft Al Wood and Clyde Bradshaw. The Bulls used the pick to draft Orlando Woolridge. The Blazers used the pick to draft Darnell Valentine.
 On January 4, 1978, the Seattle SuperSonics acquired a first-round pick from the Utah Jazz in exchange for Slick Watts. The Sonics used the pick to draft Danny Vranes.
 September 25, 1980, the Kansas City Kings acquired Joe Meriweather and a first-round pick from the New York Knicks in a three-team trade with the Knicks and the Cleveland Cavaliers. Previously, the Knicks acquired a first-round pick on October 4, 1978, from the Seattle SuperSonics in exchange for Lonnie Shelton and a 1979 first-round pick. This trade was arranged as compensation when the Knicks signed Marvin Webster on September 29, 1978. The Kings used the pick to draft Steve Johnson.
 On December 3, 1980, the Dallas Mavericks acquired 1981 and 1985 first-round picks from the Denver Nuggets in exchange for Kiki Vandeweghe and a 1986 first-round pick. The Mavericks used the pick to draft Rolando Blackman.
 On February 8, 1980, the New Jersey Nets acquired Maurice Lucas, 1980 and 1981 first-round picks from the Portland Trail Blazers in exchange for Calvin Natt. Previously, the Blazers acquired the pick on June 7, 1978, from the Golden State Warriors in exchange for a 1978 first-round pick. The Nets used the pick to draft Albert King.
 On June 12, 1980, the Detroit Pistons acquired a first-round pick from the Kansas City Kings as compensation for the signing of Leon Douglas as a free agent. The Pistons used the pick to draft Kelly Tripucka.
 On September 21, 1978, the Utah Jazz acquired a first-round pick from the Houston Rockets in exchange for Slick Watts. The Jazz used the pick to draft Danny Schayes.
 On June 8, 1981, the Indiana Pacers acquired 1981 and 1982 second-round picks on June 8, 1981, from the Cleveland Cavaliers. This trade was arranged as compensation when the Cavaliers signed James Edwards on May 25, 1981. Previously, the Kansas City Kings acquired a first-round pick on June 8, 1981, from the Cavaliers in exchange for the second-round pick. This trade was arranged as compensation when the Cavaliers signed Scott Wedman. Previously, the Cavaliers acquired the first-round pick on May 20, 1981, from the New York Knicks in exchange for Randy Smith. The Kings used the pick to draft Kevin Loder. The Pacers used the pick to draft Ray Blume.
 On August 15, 1980, the New Jersey Nets acquired a first-round pick from the San Antonio Spurs as compensation for the signing of George Johnson as a free agent. The Nets used the pick to draft Ray Tolbert.
 On October 19, 1978, the Boston Celtics acquired Chris Ford and a second-round pick from the Detroit Pistons in exchange for Earl Tatum. The Celtics used the pick to draft Tracy Jackson.
 On October 9, 1979, the Portland Trail Blazers acquired a second-round pick from the Indiana Pacers in exchange for Clemon Johnson. Previously, the Pacers acquired Bob Carrington, 1980 and 1981 second-round picks on January 27, 1978, from the New Jersey Nets in exchange for John Williamson. The Blazers used the pick to draft Brian Jackson.
 On September 12, 1980, the San Antonio Spurs acquired two second-round picks from the Chicago Bulls as compensation for the signing of Larry Kenon as a free agent. Previously, the Bulls acquired one of the pick on August 8, 1980, from the Seattle SuperSonics as compensation for the signing of Dennis Awtrey as a free agent. Previously, the Bulls acquired Oliver Mack, 1980 and 1981 second-round picks on February 13, 1980, from the Los Angeles Lakers in exchange for Mark Landsberger. Previously, the Lakers acquired 1980 and 1981 second-round picks on October 24, 1979, from the Cleveland Cavaliers in exchange for Kenny Carr. The Spurs used the picks to draft Gene Banks and Ed Rains.
 On July 8, 1980, the Kansas City Kings acquired a second-round pick from the Atlanta Hawks as compensation for the signing of Tommy Burleson as a free agent. Previously, the Hawks acquired a 1980 second-round pick and re-acquired their second-round pick on November 23, 1979, from the Utah Jazz in exchange for Terry Furlow. Previously, the Jazz acquired the pick and a 1980 second-round pick on October 10, 1979, from the Hawks in exchange for Ron Lee. The Kings used the pick to draft Eddie Johnson.
 On August 4, 1978, the Boston Celtics acquired Nate Archibald, Marvin Barnes, Billy Knight, 1981 and 1983 second-round picks from the San Diego Clippers in exchange for Kevin Kunnert, Kermit Washington, Sidney Wicks and Freeman Williams. The Celtics used the pick to draft Danny Ainge.
 On June 9, 1980, the Chicago Bulls acquired a second-round pick from the Denver Nuggets in exchange for Cedrick Hordges. The Bulls used the pick to draft Mike Olliver.
 On June 10, 1980, the Golden State Warriors acquired a second-round pick from the Washington Bullets in exchange for the draft rights to Jeff Ruland. The Warriors used the pick to draft Sam Williams.
 On September 11, 1980, the Denver Nuggets acquired Wayne Cooper and a second-round pick from the Utah Jazz in exchange for Bernard King. Previously, the Jazz acquired the pick and a 1980 third-round pick on October 9, 1979, from the Golden State Warriors in exchange for Robert Smith. The Nuggets used the pick to draft Ken Green.
 On June 8, 1981, the Washington Bullets acquired 1981 and 1983 second-round picks from the Houston Rockets in exchange for Elvin Hayes. The Bullets used the pick to draft Charles Davis.
 On October 1, 1980, the Los Angeles Lakers acquired a second-round pick from the Detroit Pistons in exchange for Wayne Robinson. Previously, the Pistons acquired a second-round pick on September 18, 1979, from the Portland Trail Blazers in exchange for Jim Brewer. The Lakers used the pick to draft Harvey Knuckles.
 On September 26, 1980, the Washington Bullets acquired 1981 and 1982 second-round picks from the San Antonio Spurs in exchange for Dave Corzine. The Bullets used the pick to draft Claude Gregory.
 On June 9, 1980, the Dallas Mavericks acquired a second-round pick from the Phoenix Suns in exchange for Wiley Peck. The Mavericks used the pick to draft Elston Turner.
 On February 4, 1980, the Washington Bullets acquired John Williamson and a second-round pick from the New Jersey Nets in exchange for Roger Phegley. Previously, the Nets acquired Otis Birdsong and the pick on June 8, 1981, from the Kansas City Kings in exchange for Cliff Robinson. Previously, the Kings acquired the pick on June 19, 1980, from the Milwaukee Bucks as compensation for the signing of Len Elmore as a free agent. The Bullets used the pick to draft Steve Lingenfelter.
 On June 28, 1978, the Houston Rockets acquired a second-round pick from the Boston Celtics as compensation for the signing of Kevin Kunnert as a free agent. The Rockets used the pick to draft Ed Turner.
 On October 31, 1980, the Cleveland Cavaliers acquired Kim Hughes, a 1981 third-round pick and a 1982 second-round pick from the Denver Nuggets in exchange for Dave Robisch. The Cavaliers used the pick to draft Mickey Dillard.
 On December 4, 1979, the New York Knicks acquired a third-round pick from the Washington Bullets in exchange for Jim Cleamons. The Knicks used the pick to draft Frank Brickowski.
 On November 3, 1980, the Golden State Warriors acquired a fourth-round pick from the Seattle SuperSonics in exchange for Rudy White. The Warriors used the pick to draft Lewis Lloyd.
 On July 10, 1978, the Kansas City Kings acquired a fourth-round pick from the Denver Nuggets in exchange for Geoff Crompton. The Kings used the pick to draft Kenny Dennard.

Draftee career notes
Isiah Thomas is the only player from this draft who has been inducted to the Basketball Hall of Fame. He was also named in the 50 Greatest Players in NBA History list announced at the league's 50th anniversary in 1996. He spent his entire 13-year career with the Detroit Pistons and won two NBA championships. He also one Finals Most Valuable Player Award, five consecutive All-NBA Team selections and twelve consecutive All-Star Game selections. After retiring as a player, Thomas went on to have a coaching career with the Indiana Pacers and the New York Knicks. Mark Aguirre, the first pick, won two NBA championships with Thomas and the Pistons. His other achievements include three All-Star Game selections. Buck Williams, the third pick, was selected to one All-NBA Team, three All-Star Games and four All-Defensive Teams. Tom Chambers, the eighth pick, was selected to two All-NBA Teams and four All-Star Games. Five other players from this draft, seventh pick Steve Johnson, ninth pick Rolando Blackman, 12th pick Kelly Tripucka, 20th pick Larry Nance and 31st pick Danny Ainge, were also selected to at least one All-Star Game each. Eddie Johnson, the 29th pick, is the only other player from this draft who has won an annual NBA award as a player; he won the Sixth Man of the Year Award in 1989. Aside from Thomas, four other players drafted also went on to have coaching careers in the NBA: Danny Ainge, 11th pick Frank Johnson, 14th pick Herb Williams and 179th pick Jay Triano.

Okayama, who attended and played junior varsity basketball at the University of Portland for one and a half years in 1976 as an exchange student, declined to try out for the Warriors and never played in the NBA. He is the tallest person ever drafted and would have been the tallest player in the NBA had he played in the league. The San Diego Clippers used their last pick in the draft, the 210th pick, to draft Tony Gwynn, who starred at both baseball and basketball at San Diego State University. Gwynn was also selected in the 1981 MLB draft by the San Diego Padres. He opted to play baseball and ended up playing 20 seasons with the Padres. Kenny Easley, a college football star from the University of California, Los Angeles, was selected by the Chicago Bulls with the 216th pick in the 10th round. Easley, who was selected fourth in the 1981 National Football League (NFL) Draft by the Seattle Seahawks, played seven seasons with the Seahawks and received several awards and honors before retiring in 1988 due to kidney problems that eventually led to a transplant.

Early entrants

College underclassmen
The following college basketball players successfully applied for early draft entrance.

  Mark Aguirre – F, DePaul (junior)
 / Leonel Marquetti – F, Hampton (junior)
  Kenny Page – G, New Mexico (junior)
  Isiah Thomas – G, Indiana (sophomore)
  Buck Williams – F, Maryland (junior)

Notes

See also
 List of first overall NBA draft picks

References
General

Specific

External links
NBA.com
NBA.com: NBA Draft History

Draft
National Basketball Association draft
NBA draft
NBA draft
1980s in Manhattan
Basketball in New York City
Sporting events in New York City
Sports in Manhattan
Madison Square Garden